Of the 7 Washington incumbents, 6 were re-elected and 1 retired.

See also 
 List of United States representatives from Washington
 United States House of Representatives elections, 1972

1972
Washington
1972 Washington (state) elections